The International Christian Maritime Association (ICMA) is an ecumenical association of 28 Christian organisations, representing different churches and Christian communities. The members are all non-profit organisations actively engaged in welfare work for people who work at sea, including seafarers, fishers and the families of both. The Association is registered as a charity in the UK and, through its members, operates internationally.

ICMA was founded in 1969. It seeks to encourage ecumenical collaboration and mutual assistance between its member organisations at international, national and individual port levels. The ICMA members' chaplains are obliged to serve seafarers, fishermen and their dependents regardless of their nationality, religion, culture, language, gender or race, in accordance with the Association's Code of Conduct.

Activities 
The International Christian Maritime Association is a professional association for port chaplaincy. It sets the standards for chaplains' education and training, accrediting courses and soliciting funds for course delivery.

ICMA considers itself an enabling network, strengthening partnerships among members and across denominations to provide a continuum of care for seafarers who move from port to port. This is achieved by regional and global meetings and conferences, a network directory, communication systems and ecumenical relations.

ICMA members employ more than 1,000 port chaplains and many more volunteer personnel. They also maintain more than 400 seafarers' centres and other shore-based welfare facilities and services in many international sea- and river ports. Its members specialise in providing face-to-face frontline pastoral care to seafarers, fishers and families in ports, on board and at home.

The Association's ministry of advocacy for seafarers rights and justice is achieved by participating in the United Nations' International Labour Organization (ILO) and the International Maritime Organization (IMO). ICMA contributed to the formulation and ratification of the Maritime Labour Convention (MLC), 2006. Members of the ICMA network also provides legal advice for chaplains who support seafarers. For example, The Mission to Seafarers has a Justice desk in London and the Seamen's Church Institute of New York and New Jersey (SCI) runs the Center for Mariner Advocacy (CMA) (formerly Center for Seafarers' Rights) from its office in New Orleans. In addition, ICMA contributes to and uses the services of Seafarers' Rights International (SRI).

ICMA collaborates in social partnership with the industry to promote the dignity and welfare of seafarers. ICMA members cooperate locally with unions and representatives of the International Transport Workers' Federation (ITF), shipping companies, agents and governments. ICMA is a member of the International Seafarers' Welfare and Assistance Network.

Member organisations 
Apostleship of the Sea / Stella Maris (Roman Catholic)
Association for Seamen's Missions (Japan)
Biblia Harbour Mission (South Africa)
Christian Seaman's Organisation (South Africa)
Church of Sweden Abroad (Svenska kyrkan i utlandet, Sweden)
Danish Seamen's Church and Church Abroad (Danske Sǿmands- og Udlandskirker, Denmark)
Finnish Seamen's Mission (Suomen Merimieskirkko, Finland)
German Seamen's Mission (Deutsche Seemannsmission e.V., Germany)
Indenlandsk Sømandsmission (Denmark)
Indonesian Ministry to Seafarers
Korean International Maritime Mission
LIFE International Seafarers Christian Missions (Romania)
Mersey Mission to Seafarers (Liverpool, England)
The Naval and Military Bible Society (UK)
Nederlandse Zeemanscentrale (Netherlands)
North American Maritime Ministry Association
Norwegian Church Abroad (Sjømannskirken, Norway)
PCT Seamen's/Fishermen's Service Centre
Queen Victoria Seamen's Rest (Methodist, London)
Royal National Mission to Deep Sea Fishers (UK)
Sailors' Society (Protestant / Free Church)
Seamen's Christian Friend Society (United Kingdom)
Seamen's Church Institute of New York and New Jersey (Episcopalian)
Seamen's Mission of Estonia
Seemannsmission der Nordkirche (Germany)
Stichting Pastoraat Werkers Overzee (Netherlands)
The Mission to Seafarers (Anglican)
World Seamen's Mission (Korea)

Further reading
Bill Down, “Seafarers,” in Chaplaincy: The Church's Sector Ministries, ed. Giles Legood (London: Cassell, 1999).

Kaarlo Kalliala, Strangership: A Theological Étude on Strangers Abroad and Aboard. Trans. Hal Martin (Helsinki: The Finnish Seamen's Mission, 1997).

Roald Kverndal, Seamen's Missions: Their Origin and Early Growth, 1986.
 
Roald Kverndal, The Way of the Sea: The Changing Shape of Mission in the Seafaring World, 2007.

Roald Kverndal, George Charles Smith of Penzance: From Nelson Sailor to Mission Pioneer, 2012.

R.W.H. Miller, The Church and the Merchant Seafarer: An Introductory History (Cambridge: Lutterworth, 2012).

Paul G. Mooney, Maritime Mission: History, Developments, A New Perspective (Zoetermeer: Uitgeverij Boekencentrum, 2005).

Paul G. Mooney,  “Serving Seafarers Under Sail and Steam: A Missiological Reflection on the Development of Maritime Missions from 1779 to 1945,” Occasional Papers of the International Association for the Study of Maritime Mission (June 2000).

Paul G. Mooney, A History of ICMA. ICMA, 2019.

Vincent A. Yzermans, American Catholic Seafarers’ Church: A narrative history of the Apostleship of Sea and the National Catholic Conference for Seafarers in the United States (Washington: The National Catholic Conference for Seafarers in the United States, 1995).

Jason Zuidema and Kevin Walker, "'Welcoming the Orphans of Globalisation': The Case for Seafarers' Ministry," Science et Esprit 72/3 (2020): 311–324.

Jason Zuidema and David Wells, 50 Years of Caring for Seafarers in Port Houston. NAMMA, 2019.

Jason Zuidema, "Seafarers' ministry in ecumenical perspective," Studi emigrazione (April–June 2015): 249–260.

References

External links
Official website
 NAMMA website

Christian ecumenical organizations
Christian missions
Christian missions to seafarers
Water transport organizations